Fróði Benjaminsen (born 14 December 1977) is a Faroese international footballer who plays as a defender or midfielder for Skála ÍF. Benjaminsen previously played for HB Tórshavn, B68 Toftir, Fram Reykjavík and B36 Tórshavn. He has appeared a record number of times for the Faroe Islands, and captained the national team since 2008. In 2015, he retired from the national team, but continued to play for HB Tórshavn in 2016. On 16 August 2016, Benjaminsen came out of international retirement, and was included in the Faroe Islands squad against Hungary in the FIFA World Cup 2018 qualification.

Club career
In 2004, Benjaminsen transferred to Fram Reykjavík of the Icelandic Úrvalsdeild. On 20 December 2004, he signed a contract with B36 Tórshavn to return to his home country.

Benjaminsen retired from club and international football in October 2015, but on 10 March 2016, Benjaminsen came out of retirement and signed a one-year deal with HB Tórshavn.

Career statistics
Scores and results list Faroe Islands' goal tally first, score column indicates score after each Benjaminsen goal.

Honours
B36 Tórshavn
Faroese League: 2005
Faroese Cup: 2006
Faroese Super Cup: 2007

Havnar Bóltfelag
Faroese League: 2009, 2010, 2013.
Faroese Super Cup: 2009, 2010

Víkingur
Faroese League: 2017
Faroese Super Cup: 2017

Individual
Effodeildin Best Player: 2001, 2009, 2010, 2013
Effodeildin Best Midfielder: 2013
Team of the Year 2013

References

External links

1977 births
Living people
People from Toftir
Faroese footballers
Association football defenders
Association football midfielders
B68 Toftir players
Knattspyrnufélagið Fram players
B36 Tórshavn players
Havnar Bóltfelag players
Víkingur Gøta players
NSÍ Runavík players
Skála ÍF players
Faroe Islands youth international footballers
Faroe Islands international footballers
Faroese expatriate footballers
Faroese expatriate sportspeople in Iceland
Expatriate footballers in Iceland